Angel Madzhirov (born 18 February 1987) is a Bulgarian footballer who currently plays as a defender for Oborishte Panagyurishte.

References

External links
 

1987 births
Living people
Bulgarian footballers
First Professional Football League (Bulgaria) players
Second Professional Football League (Bulgaria) players
FC Etar 1924 Veliko Tarnovo players
FC Sportist Svoge players
PFC Marek Dupnitsa players
PFC Pirin Gotse Delchev players
PFC Kaliakra Kavarna players
PFC Dobrudzha Dobrich players
FC Vitosha Bistritsa players
FC Strumska Slava Radomir players
FC Oborishte players
FC Bansko players
Association football defenders